Edwin Armando Valencia Rodríguez (born 29 March 1985) is a Colombian footballer who plays as a defensive midfielder.

Club career

Early career
Born in Florida, Valle del Cauca, Valencia joined América de Cali's youth setup in 1996, aged 11. He was promoted to the main squad in January 2004, appearing in 14 matches and scoring three goals in the campaign.

Atlético Paranaense
In 2007, after having his wage cut by half and thus forcing a release from América, Valencia moved abroad for the first time in his career, joining Atlético Paranense on a free transfer, along with fellow countryman and teammate Julián Viáfara. He made his Série A debut on 24 June 2007, starting in a 2–0 away win against Palmeiras.

On 12 April 2008 Valencia scored his first goal for Furacão, netting the game's winner in a home success against Toledo Colônia Work for the Campeonato Paranaense championship. He was an undisputed starter for the club, which his side narrowly avoiding relegation in the following seasons.

Fluminense
On 15 June 2010 Valencia moved to fellow league team Fluminense. He soon profited from Diogo's injury, being an important midfield unit as the club was crowned champions.

Valencia subsequently struggled with injuries and fell down through the pecking order, appearing rarely in 2012 and 2013. In 2014, despite appearing regularly, his contract was not renewed and he left Flu on 12 December.

Santos
On 16 January 2015 Valencia signed a one-year deal with Santos, also in the main level of Brazilian football. He was regularly used during the year's Campeonato Paulista, but was received little playing time after recovering from a severe knee injury suffered while in international duty.

On 5 December 2016 Valencia left Santos, after being told that his contract – expiring in the end of the month – would not be renewed.

Atlético Nacional
On 12 January 2017, Valencia returned to his homeland after agreeing to a one-year deal with Atlético Nacional.

International career
After appearing with Colombia under-20s in 2005, Valencia made his debut with the full squad on 30 May 2006, coming on as a second half substitute for Fabián Vargas in a 2–1 friendly away win against Poland.

On 28 May 2014, after being regularly called up by manager José Pékerman, Valencia suffered an injury which forced him out of 2014 FIFA World Cup. Called up for 2015 Copa América, he started the first three games of the competition, suffering a serious knee injury in the last one and being sidelined for six months.

Career statistics

Club

International

Honours

Club
Atlético Paranaense
 Campeonato Paranaense: 2009

Fluminense
 Série A: 2010, 2012
 Taça Guanabara: 2012
 Campeonato Carioca: 2012

Santos
 Campeonato Paulista: 2015, 2016

International
Colombia U20
 South American Youth Football Championship: 2005

References

External links
 
 
 

1985 births
Living people
Sportspeople from Valle del Cauca Department
Colombian footballers
Association football midfielders
Categoría Primera A players
América de Cali footballers
Atlético Nacional footballers
Campeonato Brasileiro Série A players
Club Athletico Paranaense players
Fluminense FC players
Santos FC players
Colombian expatriate footballers
Colombian expatriate sportspeople in Brazil
Expatriate footballers in Brazil
Colombia under-20 international footballers
Colombia international footballers
2015 Copa América players